Thomas Geoffrey Field (born 14 March 1997) is a professional footballer who plays as a left back.

A product of the Brentford Academy, Field graduated into the senior team in 2016. A fringe player, he departed to join Dundee in 2020. He moved to Canada to join Cavalry FC later that year, before departing at the end of the 2022 season. Born in England, Field was capped by the Republic of Ireland at U16 level.

Club career

Brentford

Youth years (2012–2016) 
Field began his career with spells in the youth systems at non-League clubs Kingstonian and Leatherhead and then joined the academy at Brentford at age 15. He was a part of the Bees' U15 team which won the Junior category in the 2012 Milk Cup. Field progressed to sign scholarship forms at the end of the 2012–13 season and made 45 appearances and scored two goals for the youth team over the following two seasons. Moving from the wing to left back, he made his Development Squad debut while an U17 and signed a one-year Development Squad contract at the end of the 2014–15 season. Field signed a new 18-month contract in November 2015 and made his first team debut with a start in a 3–0 victory over West London rivals Fulham on 30 April 2016. He assisted Scott Hogan for one of the goals from a corner, but was forced off after 53 minutes with a calf injury.

First team (2016–17) 
Field was promoted into the first team group during the 2016–17 pre-season and the departure of long-term left back Jake Bidwell on 1 July 2016, meant that he became the only available senior left back, which allowed him to play the full 90 minutes in friendlies versus Vfl Bochum and Wycombe Wanderers. Field made his first competitive appearance of the season versus Exeter City in the EFL Cup first round on 9 August 2016, and played the full 120 minutes of the extra time defeat, but he could not break into the league lineup due to the arrival of loan left back Callum Elder. After a period out with an injured groin, he made his first league appearance of the season as a second-half substitute for Yoann Barbet during a 2–1 victory over Burton Albion on 10 December. After two further starts, Field signed a -year first team contract on 23 December. He scored the first senior goals of his career with a brace in a 5–1 FA Cup third round victory over Eastleigh on 7 January 2017. Field lost his place to fit-again Rico Henry in February and ended the 2016–17 season with 17 appearances and three goals.

Out of favour (2017–2020) 
With ample cover for Rico Henry at full back, Field joined League One club Bradford City on loan until 1 January 2018, as cover for the injured Adam Chicksen. He made five appearances before dropping to the bench in mid-September after Chicksen returned to fitness. Despite Chicksen suffering a long-term injury in mid-October, Field made just three further appearances before returning to Brentford when his loan expired. Field's only call into a Brentford matchday squad during the second half of 2017–18 came on the final day of the season, when he was an unused substitute during a 1–1 draw with Hull City.

After two EFL Cup appearances in August 2018, Field joined League Two club Cheltenham Town on loan until 1 January 2019. In an injury-affected spell, he made just 11 appearances before his loan expired. After his return to Brentford, injuries to full backs Henrik Dalsgaard and Rico Henry saw Field make his final appearance of the season as a substitute for stand-in right back Sergi Canós after 83 minutes of a 1–0 win over Aston Villa on 13 February 2019.

After failing to win a call into a matchday squad so far during the 2019–20 season, Field was made available for transfer in January 2020. He departed the club on the final day of the January 2020 transfer window and ended his time at Griffin Park with 21 appearances and three goals.

Dundee 
On 31 January 2020, Field joined Scottish Championship club Dundee on a contract running until the end of the 2019–20 season. Field made his only appearance for the club as a substitute for Declan McDaid after 75 minutes of a 0–0 draw with Ayr United on 7 March 2020. As a result of the COVID-19 pandemic leading to the suspension and cancellation of the season, Field's contract was extended to 1 July, after which he was released.

Cavalry FC 
On 28 December 2020, Field signed a multi-year contract with Canadian Premier League club Cavalry FC. Either side of three months sidelined with a torn hip flexor, he made 12 appearances during a 2021 season which ended with defeat in the play-off semi-finals. Field was retained for the 2022 season, but missed the club's pre-season training camp and the entire regular season due to a "freak training accident", which required knee surgery. On 8 November 2022, it was announced that Field had departed the club. In January 2023, he joined FC Tigers Vancouver for off-season training.

International career 
Field won two caps for the Republic of Ireland U16 team in friendlies versus Estonia in Dublin in November 2012.

Personal life 
Field is a Brentford supporter.

Career statistics

References

External links 
 

1997 births
Living people
Association football fullbacks
Republic of Ireland association footballers
English footballers
Footballers from Kingston upon Thames
Republic of Ireland expatriate association footballers
English expatriate footballers
Expatriate soccer players in Canada
Irish expatriate sportspeople in Canada
English expatriate sportspeople in Canada
Brentford F.C. players
Bradford City A.F.C. players
Cheltenham Town F.C. players
Dundee F.C. players
Cavalry FC players
English Football League players
Scottish Professional Football League players
Republic of Ireland youth international footballers
Canadian Premier League players
English expatriates in Canada
Irish expatriates in Canada